The Suzhou RunHua Global Center, formerly the SPG Global Towers, are a pair of skyscrapers in Suzhou, China. Groundbreaking on the buildings began in 2007, and they were completed in 2010.

The towers bear a striking resemblance to the One Liberty Place skyscraper complex in Philadelphia, United States.

References

Skyscrapers in Suzhou
Suzhou Industrial Park
Towers in China
Skyscraper office buildings in China
Residential skyscrapers in China